Optiver is a proprietary trading firm and market maker for various exchange-listed financial instruments. Its name derives from the Dutch , or "option trader". The company is privately owned. Optiver trades listed derivatives, cash equities, exchange-traded funds, bonds, and foreign exchange.

History
Optiver was founded by Johann Kaemingk on April 9, 1986, as a market maker in options on the European Options Exchange (EOE), which is now Euronext. Optiver is a member of the European Principal Traders Association (FIA EPTA), FIA Principal Trading Group (PTG) in the US and FIA Japan.

In November 2016, Optiver was reported to have joined a consortium to build a faster data transmission network between Chicago and Tokyo.

In December 2017, Optiver joined with Equiduct to offer a one-stop shop for best execution.

In June 2019, Optiver joined its US-based rival, Virtu, in funding Equiduct, a competitor to national stock exchanges and trading venues.

In April 2021, Optiver expanded further into the Asia-Pacific region with an office in Singapore, with a planned focus on commodity and equity products. It joined many other major financial services firms in doing so. The firm first made its presence in the region in Australia in 1996, then Taipei in 2005, then Hong Kong in 2007, and then Shanghai in 2012.

In November 2018, Utrecht University and Optiver partnered to create an Algorithms in Finance course.

In June 2022, Optiver joined Acquis Exchange.

In September 2022, the firm became the latest trading member on the Vienna Stock Exchange.

See also
Market makers
Proprietary trading

References 

Financial services companies established in 1986
Financial services companies of the Netherlands
Companies based in Amsterdam